Dimitra Arliss (October 23, 1932 – January 26, 2012) was an American actress.

Early life and education 
Arliss was born in Lorain, Ohio, on October 23, 1932, of Greek descent. She attended Miami University.

Career 
Arliss's acting career began at the Goodman Theatre in Chicago. She gained attention in Arthur L. Kopit's Broadway play Indians (1970), playing Teskanjavila, a Native American character who spoke with an Italian accent. She also appeared on Broadway as Eurydice in Antigone (1971) and as Catherine Petkoff in Arms and the Man (1985).

Her films included The Sting (1973), in which she portrayed Loretta Salino, a murderess for hire, Xanadu, Firefox, and Bless the Child. Her acting on television included Bella Mia and Rich Man, Poor Man and episodes of Dallas and Quincy, M. E.

Voice-over work 
She voiced Anastasia Hardy in the Spider-Man: The Animated Series episodes "The Sins Of The Fathers, Chapter II: Make A Wish" (1995) and "The Sins Of The Fathers, Chapter IV: Enter The Green Goblin" (1996).

Death
Arliss died at the Motion Picture & Television Fund Hospital in Woodland Hills, California, at age 79, from complications of a stroke, and was buried at the Forest Lawn, Hollywood Hills Cemetery in Los Angeles.

Filmography

Film

Television

References

External links
 
 

1932 births
2012 deaths
Actresses from Ohio
American film actresses
20th-century American actresses
American people of Greek descent
American soap opera actresses
American stage actresses
American television actresses
American voice actresses
People from Lorain, Ohio
Burials at Forest Lawn Memorial Park (Hollywood Hills)
21st-century American women